Expedición Robinson was the Ecuadorian version of the popular show Expedition Robinson, or Survivor as it is called in some countries. The show only ran for one season that lasted from August 28, 2003, to October 26, 2003, and was presented by Marisa Sánchez. The sixteen contestants were initially separated into two tribes, Akela and Bimbuka both named after indigenous Ecuadorian words. The first major twist of the season occurred in episode three when both tribes were forced to vote out one member of their tribe. In episode four, the show saw its first voluntary exit as Penélope Benalcázar decided to leave the competition. From episode five onwards the Akela tribe began to dominate the challenges, winning two of the three immunity challenges. When it came time for the merge, the Akela tribe quickly fell apart as five of its former members were voted out in a row. When it came time for the final four, the contestants competed in two challenges to determine who would be the final two. Both Tania Tenorio and Victor Herrera lost these challenges and were eliminated. Ultimately, it was Tito Grefa, the only member of the Akela tribe to make the final five, who won the season over Francisco Gordillo with a jury vote of 6-1.

Finishing order

External links
 http://www.eluniverso.com/2003/08/23/0001/262/EFDA1B50D37640A28DE3F4431EADA5B3.html
 http://www.eluniverso.com/2003/10/28/0001/262/12DE539B32A148FB824BF9B5AA6E2229.html

Expedition Robinson
Ecuadorian reality television series
2003 Ecuadorian television series debuts
2003 Ecuadorian television series endings
2000s Ecuadorian television series
Survivor (franchise)
Teleamazonas original programming